Isaak Hassler (c. 1530, in St. Joachimsthal – 14 July 1591, in Nuremberg) was a German Lutheran organist and music teacher, mainly active in Nuremberg. He is also notable as the father of the musicians Jakob Hassler, Hans Leo Hassler and Kasper Hassler.

External links
http://www.bmlo.lmu.de/Q/GND=132950065
http://www.deutsche-biographie.de/sfz28111.html

1530 births
1591 deaths
German organists
German male organists